Ingemar Jernberg (born 28 November 1950) is a Swedish athlete. He competed in the men's pole vault at the 1972 Summer Olympics and the 1976 Summer Olympics.

References

1950 births
Living people
Athletes (track and field) at the 1972 Summer Olympics
Athletes (track and field) at the 1976 Summer Olympics
Swedish male pole vaulters
Olympic athletes of Sweden
Place of birth missing (living people)